Bamboo Brook Outdoor Education Center is a botanical garden and public park in Chester Township, New Jersey. The house and garden, listed using its historic name, Merchiston Farm, was added to the National Register of Historic Places on November 13, 1989 for its significance as the home of the American landscape architect Martha Brookes Hutcheson and her landscaping of the property.

Gallery

See also

 Willowwood Arboretum – adjoining park
 List of botanical gardens and arboretums in New Jersey
 National Register of Historic Places listings in Morris County, New Jersey

References

External links
 
 

Chester Township, New Jersey
Botanical gardens in New Jersey
Parks in Morris County, New Jersey
County parks in New Jersey
National Register of Historic Places in Morris County, New Jersey
New Jersey Register of Historic Places